A list of films released in Japan in 1967 (see 1967 in film).

List of films

See also 
1967 in Japan
1967 in Japanese television

References

Footnotes

Sources

External links
Japanese films of 1967 at the Internet Movie Database

1967
Japanese
Films